Bengt-Olov Almstedt (born 4 April 1942) is a Swedish former backstroke and freestyle swimmer. He competed in two events at the 1960 Summer Olympics.

References

External links
 

1942 births
Living people
Swedish male backstroke swimmers
Swedish male freestyle swimmers
Olympic swimmers of Sweden
Swimmers at the 1960 Summer Olympics
Sportspeople from Örebro
20th-century Swedish people